John Tonner (20 February 1898 – 1978) was a Scottish footballer who played in the Football League for Bristol City, Crystal Palace and Clapton Orient. His brothers Jimmy and Sam were also professional footballers.

References

1898 births
1978 deaths
Scottish footballers
Association football forwards
English Football League players
Dunfermline Athletic F.C. players
Leyton Orient F.C. players
Fulham F.C. players
Crystal Palace F.C. players
Thames A.F.C. players